KSMO is a radio station airing a country music format licensed to Salem, Missouri, broadcasting on 1340 kHz AM.  The station is owned by KSMO Enterprises.

References

External links

Country radio stations in the United States
SMO
Radio stations established in 1953
1953 establishments in Missouri